The Matilda Bay Brewing Company was a West Australian brewery. It was the first new brewery opened in Australia since World War II and Australia's first craft brewery. Originating from small batches brewed for the Sail and Anchor Hotel in 1984, their main brewery opened in 1989 in a prominent building on the Stirling Highway occupied by Ford Motor Company. The company was purchased by Carlton & United Breweries in the early 1990s (now part of Asahi Breweries).

History
In 1983 Phil Sexton (a former brewer for the Swan Brewery), together with Garry Gosatti, John Tollis and Ron Groves, formed Brewtech Pty Ltd to brew commercial boutique beers. Due to lack of support from Perth Hotels the company purchased and renovated the Freemasons Hotel on the corner of South Terrace and Henderson Street, Fremantle. The hotel was renovated, a micro brewery installed and renamed the Sail and Anchor, under the banner of Anchor Brewing Company.  The first beer, Anchor Ale, "a dark, copper-coloured, traditional ale", was produced in late 1984.

In 1985 Brewtech opened their second venue, The Brewery Alehouse on Stirling Highway in Nedlands. The Company also established a second micro brewery at 31 Carrington Street in Nedlands, which housed the Matilda Bay Brewing Company and began producing beers in 1985. In 1986 the company launched its first wheat beer, Redback, which went on to be one of the company's best commercial successes. In 1987 Brewtech Pty Ltd changed their name to Brewtech Limited, following which they made the decision to consolidate their business under the Matilda Bay Brewing Company banner. The Company purchased another three outlets in Perth (including the Queens Hotel in Beaufort Street and the Brass Monkey in Northbridge).

In 1988 Carlton & United Breweries (a wholly owned subsidiary of Elders IXL) purchased a 20% shareholding in the Matilda Bay Brewing Company, which led to the company in 1989 purchasing larger premises, the former Ford Motor Company building, on Stirling Highway in North Fremantle to brew their beers. In 1990, Elders IXL renamed the Foster's Group purchased the Matilda Bay Brewing Company, in a deal that valued Matilda Bay at more than A$50m. Carlton & United then sold the Sail and Anchor Hotel to the Australian Leisure and Hospitality Group (ALH), a subsidiary of Woolworths Limited, who subsequently closed the micro-brewery operations at the hotel.

In 2000 the original brewers of Matilda Bay opened the Little Creatures microbrewery in Fremantle.

In 2005, the Matilda Bay Garage Brewery began operating in South Dandenong, Victoria in an effort to brew small batches of more experimental beers, such as Alpha Pale Ale and Dogbolter, Crema, Barking Duck and Rooftop Red Lager.

In June 2007 Fosters announced the Perth-based brewery would close in September and its beer production would be moved to its other breweries to improve cost and capital efficiency, with most of the larger volume production beers, such as Redback, Beez Neez, Fat Yak and Bohemian Pilsner being moved to the Cascade Brewery in Hobart.

In 2012 the company opened the Matilda Bay Brewery Bar in the former Cadbury factory building in Port Melbourne, relocating the brewery operations from Dandenong. The Brewery Bar was finally closed in 2014 with production of Matilda Bay beers moved to the Cascade Brewery in Hobart.

In 2019 Carlton & United Breweries and original founder Phil Sexton went into partnership to re-establish the brand, with a new brewery built in the Yarra Valley. The Yak beers were disconnected from the Matilda Bay brand and are brewed in Carlton United Breweries facilities across the country, with Matilda Bay Brewing Company brewing a new range of beers out of their Yarra Valley Brewery.

Beers
Current
 Alpha Pale Ale, a North American style pale ale (5.2% alc/vol). In 2003 it won more awards than any other beer at the Australian International Beer Awards (AIBA).
 Redback, a German style hefeweizen or wheat beer (4.7% alc/vol), named after the infamous Australian spider. Originally released in 1986 as a seasonal beer called Summer Wheat, it was renamed in 1987 and released nationwide. In 1993 it was awarded grand champion at the Australian International Beer Awards (AIBA).
 Dogbolter, a Munich style dark lager (5.2% alc/vol). First released in 1987.
 Owl Original Ale, a European style golden ale (4.2% alc/vol). 

Past
 Bohemian Pilsner, a Czech-style pilsner (4.7% alc/vol).
 Beez Neez, a specialty honey-infused wheat beer (4.7% alc/vol). Often changes yearly due to honey supplies and varieties available.
 Rooftop Red Lager, made using red crystal malts.
 Big Helga, a Munich style lager (helles) (4.7% alc/vol).
 Brewers' Reserve Alpha Pale Ale, an American style Pale Ale.
 Brewers' Reserve Dogbolter, a dark lager.
 MB21, a strong, dark, unfiltered wheat beer. MB21 is not available for sale, or public ownership. Bottle size is 750ml, with a directly printed label design and a large, heavy red wax seal. At last count, all production units of MB21 were accounted for.
 Fat Yak, an American style pale ale (4.7% alc/vol).
 Wild Yak, Pacific Ale (4.2% alc/vol). Subtle aromas of south seas yak.
 Matilda Bay I.G.P. (Itchy Green Pants), a cloudy Australian pale ale (4.7% alc/vol).
 Minimum Chips Handcut Golden Lager, a golden lager (4.7% alc/vol)
 The Ducks, an Australian pale ale. (4.2% alc/vol)

See also

 List of breweries in Australia

Notes

Australian beer brands
Beer brewing companies based in Victoria (Australia)
History of Fremantle
Australian companies established in 1983
Food and drink companies established in 1983
Foster's Group
AB InBev brands
Asahi Breweries